Group D of the 2014 FIFA World Cup consisted of Uruguay, Costa Rica, England and Italy. This was the only group to contain more than one previous winner of the World Cup. It was also the only group with three top 10 FIFA World Ranking teams as of October 2013 (ranking date for final draw) and at the start of the competition. Play began on 14 June and ended on 24 June 2014.

Costa Rica topped the group undefeated, despite being considered underdogs and expected to finish last in a group containing three former winners of the competition. Two of them, England and Italy, were eliminated.

Teams

Notes

Standings

Costa Rica advanced to play Greece (runner-up of Group C) in the round of 16.
Uruguay advanced to play Colombia (winner of Group C) in the round of 16.

Matches

Uruguay vs Costa Rica
The two teams had met in 10 previous matches, most recently in 2009 in the CONCACAF – CONMEBOL play-off, won by Uruguay 2–1 on aggregate to qualify for the 2010 FIFA World Cup.

Uruguay led the game 1–0 at half time, through an Edinson Cavani penalty after Diego Lugano was pulled down in the box by Júnior Díaz. Keylor Navas prevented Uruguay's lead from doubling by tipping over Diego Forlán's shot. In the second half, Joel Campbell equalised with a low shot to the right corner when the ball fell to him in the box after a deep cross from Cristian Gamboa on the right. Soon afterwards, Costa Rica went into the lead when Óscar Duarte scored with a low diving header to the right corner after a free kick from Christian Bolaños.
A pass from Campbell allowed substitute Marco Ureña to make it 3–1 with a low shot from a tight angle on the right, and in injury time Maxi Pereira was given a straight red card for a kick at Campbell.

It was the first time Costa Rica scored three goals in a World Cup match, and also the first time that Uruguay lost to a non-South American or non-European country in the World Cup.

England vs Italy
The two teams had met in 24 previous matches, including in the 1990 FIFA World Cup third place match, won by Italy 2–1. Their most recent competitive meeting was in the UEFA Euro 2012 quarter-finals, won by Italy on penalties after a scoreless draw.

Italy went ahead first, when from a short corner, Andrea Pirlo dummied Marco Verratti's pass, and Claudio Marchisio scored with a low right footed shot from outside the penalty box.
England quickly equalised through a close-range Daniel Sturridge goal from a Wayne Rooney cross from the left. The scores were level at 1–1 at half time, but Mario Balotelli headed Italy's winner from close range five minutes after play resumed from a cross by Antonio Candreva on the right.

The England physiotherapist Gary Lewin was stretchered off with a dislocated ankle suffered in the celebrations for England's goal, which ruled him out for the rest of the World Cup.

Uruguay vs England
The two teams had met in ten previous matches, including twice in the FIFA World Cup (1954, quarter-finals: Uruguay 4–2 England; 1966, group stage: Uruguay 0–0 England). Uruguay defender Maxi Pereira was suspended for the match, after being sent off in the team's match against Costa Rica.

Uruguay took the lead in the first half, the goal headed in by Luis Suárez from a cross by Edinson Cavani on the left.
England equalised in the second half, when Wayne Rooney scored his first World Cup goal with a tap-in from a cross by Glen Johnson from the right. Suárez later secured Uruguay's victory, receiving the ball from goalkeeper Fernando Muslera's clearance which flicked off Steven Gerrard, and shot home his second goal of the match powerfully with his right foot.

This was the first time that England lost three World Cup matches in a row, dating back to England's loss to Germany in the 2010 World Cup round of 16.

Italy vs Costa Rica

The two teams had met in one previous match, in a friendly in 1994.

Mario Balotelli had Italy's best chance in the first half, lobbing the ball wide from inside the penalty area. Late in the first half, Joel Campbell had a clear penalty appeal denied, but Costa Rica nevertheless took the lead within a minute, as Júnior Díaz crossed from the left for Bryan Ruiz to head the ball onto the crossbar and over the line from close range.
Costa Rica was able to hold on for the win in the second half, ensuring their qualification for the knockout stage, their first since 1990, while simultaneously ensuring England's group stage exit, their first since 1958.

Costa Rica became the second country to beat two World Cup champions in the group stage of one tournament, the other being Denmark, who had done it twice in 1986 (Uruguay and West Germany) and 2002 (Uruguay and France). Italy goalkeeper Gianluigi Buffon appeared in his fourth World Cup (he was also in the squad for the 1998 FIFA World Cup, but did not appear in any match), the fifth Italian player to do so.

Coincidentally, Costa Rica's qualification to the Round of 16 occurred exactly twenty-four years after their victory against Sweden at the 1990 FIFA World Cup, which also sealed their first-ever qualification to the Round of 16. Because of this, La Nación's Rodrigo Calvo called 20 June "a blessed date" for the Costa Rican team.

Italy vs Uruguay

The two teams had met in eight previous matches, including twice in the FIFA World Cup (1970, group stage: Italy 0–0 Uruguay; 1990, round of 16: Italy 2–0 Uruguay). Their most recent meeting was in the 2013 FIFA Confederations Cup third place match, won by Italy 3–2 on penalties (2–2 draw after extra time).

After a goalless first half, Italy were reduced to 10 men in the second half when Claudio Marchisio was sent off for a studs-up challenge on Egidio Arévalo. The only goal of the game came when Uruguay's Gastón Ramírez delivered a corner from the right which Diego Godín rose to head with the ball going in off his back. Uruguay's win qualified them for the knockout stage as the group runners-up, and eliminated Italy from the tournament; this marked the second consecutive time that Italy had been eliminated at the group stage.

Suárez bite
Around the 79th minute, Uruguay forward Luis Suárez bit the left shoulder of Italian defender Giorgio Chiellini. Chiellini showed the bite marks to Mexican referee Marco Rodríguez, who missed the incident. As the Italian players protested to the referee for not penalising Suárez, Uruguay won a corner and Godín scored. In the 84th minute, a member of the Italian coaching staff was dismissed from the bench by the referee after an altercation with his Uruguayan counterparts. After the biting incident, Suárez claimed that he "had contact with [Chiellini's] shoulder, nothing more" and that "these things happen".

On the same day of the match, FIFA opened disciplinary proceedings against Suárez regarding the biting incident. During the proceedings, FIFA confirmed that Suárez's previous two bans due to biting incidents (seven games for biting Otman Bakkal while playing for Ajax and 10 games for biting Branislav Ivanović while playing for Liverpool) would be taken into account. Two days after the match, the FIFA Disciplinary Committee banned Suárez for nine international matches, effective immediately, meaning he would take no further part in the World Cup. It was the longest such ban in World Cup history, exceeding the eight-match ban handed to Italy's Mauro Tassotti for breaking the nose of Spain's Luis Enrique at the 1994 FIFA World Cup. He was also banned from taking part in any football-related activity (including entering any stadium) for four months and fined CHF100,000 (approx. £65,700/€82,000/US$119,000). The verdict would not prevent Suárez from transferring to another club. Suárez later admitted that he had bitten Chiellini and formally apologised, while writing that the "physical result of a bite" occurred in a collision with Chiellini. On 3 July, the Uruguayan Football Association (AUF) appealed against the decision to FIFA, but it was rejected on 10 July. After an appeal to the Court of Arbitration for Sport, Suárez was later allowed to participate in training and friendly matches with new club Barcelona.

Costa Rica vs England
The two teams had never met before.

As England could no longer advance to the knockout stage, their manager Roy Hodgson made nine changes to the starting line-up with Frank Lampard captaining the side. The match finished goalless, and the draw was enough to confirm Costa Rica, which had already sealed their place in the knockout stage, as the group winners with seven points after three matches.

This was England's 11th goalless draw in World Cup history, more than any other team.

References

External links

2014 FIFA World Cup Group D, FIFA.com

2014 FIFA World Cup
England at the 2014 FIFA World Cup
Italy at the 2014 FIFA World Cup
Uruguay at the 2014 FIFA World Cup
Costa Rica at the 2014 FIFA World Cup